Andrew Bernard Chisick (June 10, 1916 – March 13, 1986) was an American football center. 

A native of Sagamore, Pennsylvania, he grew up  in Newark, New Jersey where he attended Good Counsel High School and then played college football for Villanova. He was drafted by the Chicago Cardinals with the 51st pick in the 1940 NFL Draft and appeared in 22 NFL games for the Cardinals during the 1940 and 1941 seasons. He enlisted in the United States Marine Corps in February 1942 and participated in four major battles in the Solomon Islands campaign.

References

1916 births
1986 deaths
Chicago Cardinals players
Villanova Wildcats football players
Players of American football from Newark, New Jersey
Players of American football from Pennsylvania
United States Marine Corps personnel of World War II